Elke Aberle (born  1 July 1950) is a German actress.

Selected filmography
 Love (1956)
 Widower with Five Daughters (1957)
 Bimbo the Great (1958)
 Father, Mother and Nine Children (1958)
 Ooh... diese Ferien (1958)
 Big Request Concert (1960)
 What Is Father Doing in Italy? (1961)
  (1964)
 Who Laughs Last, Laughs Best (1971)
 Schwarzwaldfahrt aus Liebeskummer (1974)
 Anton, zieh die Bremse an! (1976)
 Von der Liebe und den Zwängen: Mutmaßungen über Fassbinders 'Ich will doch nur, daß ihr mich liebt''' (2010)

Television roles
 Tatort König Heinrich IV.''

References

External links
 

1950 births
Living people
People from Neuss
German film actresses
German television actresses
20th-century German actresses
21st-century German actresses